Northwest Cabarrus High School, commonly referred to simply as Northwest and abbreviated as NCHS, is a comprehensive public high school located in Cabarrus County, North Carolina, United States. The school is a part of the Cabarrus County Schools system. While the school has a Concord mailing address, it is physically located in the city limits of neighboring Kannapolis.

It opened in 1966, merging the former high schools in the Odell and Winecoff communities.

Academics 
Northwest's academic coursework falls in line with the North Carolina Standard Course of Study in all core subject areas.  Advanced Placement courses are offered in United States History, American Government and Politics, Biology, Studio Art, Chemistry, Physics, Environmental Science, English language, English Literature, Statistics, and Calculus.

Athletics 
Northwest's athletic teams are known as the Trojans. The school is in the 3A classification of the North Carolina High School Athletic Association.  In 2009 Northwest's athletics teams moved back to the South Piedmont Conference, after competing in the North Piedmont Conference from 2001 to 2009.  The school sponsors boys' football, tennis, cross country, soccer, basketball, wrestling, swimming, baseball, track, and golf; and girls' tennis, volleyball, cross country, soccer, basketball, swimming, softball, track, and cheerleading.

The Trojan athletic program has won three team state championships—one in baseball (1971), and two in girls cross country (1990 and 1991).

Fine Arts

ITS (International Thespian Society)

ITS is a student honorary division of the Educational Theatre Association. ITS offers festivals and conferences to further a student's education in theatre. Continued activities are conducted by the President and Vice-President.

Continued Events planned by ITS

 Fall Play
 Spring Musical
 Musical Theatre Showcase
 One Act Play
 Trunk-or-Treat
 Improv Team
 24 Hour Play Project
 10 Minute Play Festival

Awards
In 2012 the Advanced Acting class took the one act play, "The Yellow Boat" to NCTC (North Carolina Theatre Conference) Regionals. Awards received at regionals include: Outstanding Achievement in Ensemble Acting, Excellence in Directing(Andrea Rassler), Excellence in Acting(Lole Johnson), and Distinguished Play(votes from the Audience). The Show Advanced to NCTC (North Carolina Theatre Conference) States for the first time where they received an award in Excellence in Use of Props.

Nominations

The Blumey Awards: "The program’s mission is to recognize, reward and encourage talent and achievement in musical theater among high school students in the greater Charlotte area. The Blumey Awards highlight the importance of musical theater and arts education."

 Zombie Prom (2012)Lights (Nomination)
 Flight of the LawnChair Man (2013)Costumes (Nomination)
 Flight of the LawnChair Man (2013)Featured Actor, Emily Absher (Nomination)
 Little Women (2015)Supporting Actress, Karen Stahl (Nomination)
 Little Women (2015)Lead Actress, Lauren Hunkele (Win)
 You're a Good Man, Charlie Brown (2016)Lead Actor, Kaleb Jenkins (Nomination)

Principals 
Robert Garmon (1967–1978)
Bernie Edwards (1978–1986)
Glenda Poole (1986–1991)
Larry Woods (1991–1994)
Ken Cartrett (1994–1997)
Walter Hart (1998–2000)
Phil Hull (2000–2003)
Dan Meehan (2003–2006)
Sharon Abercrombie (2006–2007)
Lynn Rhymer (2007–2011)
Mike Jolley  (2011–2016)
Chris Myers (2016–Present)

Notable alumni 
Corey LaJoie (2009), NASCAR driver
Bradley Pinion (2012), NFL punter and Super Bowl LV champion
Rachel Reilly (2002), contestant on Big Brother 12 and winner of Big Brother 13
Corey Seager (2012), MLB shortstop, 3x All-Star selection, 2020 World Series MVP
Kyle Seager (2006), MLB third baseman and 2014 All-Star selection
Skeet Ulrich (1988), actor
Darrell 'Bubba' Wallace, Jr. (2011), NASCAR driver

References 

Schools in Cabarrus County, North Carolina
Public high schools in North Carolina
Educational institutions established in 1966
1966 establishments in North Carolina